Sandy Gellis (born 1940) is an American artist known for her artworks that depict and interpret the natural environment. Her work is included in the collections of the Whitney Museum of American Art and the Brooklyn Museum.

References

External links
 Official website

1940 births
Living people
20th-century American women artists
21st-century American women artists